Fox Sports Arabia (formerly ESPN STAR Sports Arabia from 1997 to 1998) was an Emirati pay television sports channel that broadcast to the entire MENA region including the Middle East and North Africa. It was available as a part of the STAR Select package of television channels.

The channel was originally launched as Fox Sports on 16 January 1998. The channel changed its name to Fox Sports Middle East on 1 April 1999, but it was apparently later renamed back to Fox Sports, before it was eventually shut down.

References

See also
 Fox Sports (Southeast Asian TV network)
 Star Sports (Indian TV network)

Fox Sports International
Television channels and stations established in 1997
Television channels and stations disestablished in 2000